Pierre Bismuth (6 June 1963) is a French artist and filmmaker based in Brussels. His practice can be placed in the tradition of conceptual art and appropriation art. His work uses a variety of media and materials, including painting, sculpture, collage, video, architecture, performance,  music, and film.  He is best known for being among the authors of the story for Eternal Sunshine of the Spotless Mind (2004), for which he won the Academy Award for Best Original Screenplay alongside Michel Gondry and Charlie Kaufman. Bismuth made his directorial debut with the 2016 feature film Where is Rocky II?.

Life 
Pierre Bismuth was originally a visual communication student at les Arts Décoratifs. He met François Miehe there, one of his teachers, with whom he subsequently collaborated on several projects.

In the 1980s Pierre Bismuth moved to Berlin where he attended Georg Baselitz's class of the Hochschule der Kunst. When he returned to France, he settled in Paris where he shared a studio with Xavier Veilhan and Pierre Huyghe.

At the beginning of the 1990s, he settled in Brussels where he gave the opening show of Jan Mot's new gallery on the rue Dansaert. In 2000, he moved to London, prompted by the Lisson Gallery, where he has had several exhibitions since then.

In 2005, after having settled in Brussels again, he was awarded, along with director Michel Gondry and screenwriter Charlie Kaufman, an Academy Award for Best Original Screenplay for the film Eternal Sunshine of the Spotless Mind (2004), which many critics consider one of the best films of the 2000s.

Since then, his work has continued to be shown all over Europe and America.

Work 

Through efficient and often humorous gestures, Bismuth interrupts pre-established codes of reading the images and objects that pervade daily life, from headline stories in newspapers to magazine clippings from gentlemen's magazines, to even the color of the walls. In his series From Red to Nothing and From Green to Something Else, Bismuth reproduces a painted wall in each exhibition, subtly altering the color by the addition of a small amount of white or colored paint to the original color. Another series Something less, Something More (2002–2006) consists of thin partitions out of which Bismuth removes circles until as little material as possible remained, while the circles removed from the partitions accumulate on the floor. 

In Replaced by the Same (2003), Bismuth plays on the idea of substituting one thing by its double: for each photograph in this series, elements taken from duplicates are glued on exactly the same place as they were on the originals.

Bismuth often plays with the film industry imagery, as in his Jungle Book Project where he uses the different translations of the famous Disney film to create a new Babel like environnement. He is also known for following the movement of actors and actresses hands during a full movie and reproducing these as drawings. Moreover, the re-use of the famous words "The End" or "Coming Soon" featured in movies or trailers is also a recurrent work. "Coming Soon" is featured as a permanent public luminous art work in Geneva.

Collaborations

A striking aspect of Bismuth's artistic practice consists in his collaborations with other artists from the most various fields. He notably collaborated with Michel Gondry, Jerome Bel, Jonathan Monk, Dessislava Dimova, Diego Perone, Barbara Visser, Angus Fairhurst, Cory Arcangel, Mathias Faldbakken or Joe Strummer.

Exhibitions (selection)

Galleries
Pierre Bismuth is represented by the following galleries: 
 Galerie Jan Mot, Bruxelles
 Galerie Bugada & Cargnel, Paris
 Christine König Galerie, Vienne
 Team Gallery, New-York
He has among others also exhibited at the Galerie Yvon Lambert in Paris,  at the Lisson Gallery in London,  at Sonia Rosso in Turin, at Roger Pailhas in Marseille and also at Mary Boone in New-York.

Notes and references

External links
 "Coming Soon !" one of the 13 luminous installations of the Neon Parallax public art project on the Plaine of Plainpalais, Geneva.
Cosmic Galerie
 Christine König Galerie, Vienna, Austria
Team Gallery

Best Original Screenplay Academy Award winners
Writers Guild of America Award winners
French mixed-media artists
1963 births
Living people
French male screenwriters
French screenwriters
École nationale supérieure des arts décoratifs alumni
French contemporary artists